This partial list of city nicknames in Turkey compiles the aliases, sobriquets and slogans that cities in Turkey are known by (or have been known by historically), officially and unofficially, to locals, outsiders or their tourism boards or chambers of commerce.

Bursa
"Green Bursa"
İstanbul
"Augusta Antonina"
"New Rome" / "Second Rome"
"Dersaadet" ( 'Gate of Felicity')
"Derâliye" ( 'Sublime Gate') Der being the Persian word for door
"Bâb-ı Âlî" ( 'The Sublime Porte')
"Pâyitaht" ('The Seat of the Throne')
"Asitane" (From Persian 'The Doorstep' of the Sultan/Government or 'The Center' of Ottoman Empire).
İzmir
"Pearl of Aegean"
"Gâvur İzmir" (Infidel Izmir)
Şanlıurfa
"City of Prophets" or "Realm of Prophets" "

References 

Turkey
City nicknames